Akec Makur Chuot (born 5 September 1992) is an Australian rules footballer who plays for the Hawthorn Football Club in the AFL Women's competition.

Chuot was born on 5 September 1992 in South Sudan, the same year her father died. She was raised by her single mother in a family of seven and for twelve years they lived in Kakuma, refugee camp in Kenya. The family was sponsored by their uncle and moved to Perth. She attended Aranmore Catholic College. Her sister is Ayor Makur Chuot, a member of the Western Australian Legislative Council representing the North Metropolitan region.

In 2009, she tried Australian Rules football for the first time at an East Perth Football Club all-girls carnival. Chuot was drafted by Fremantle with their 18th selection and 139th overall in the 2016 AFL Women's draft. She was also one of the Australian Post Multicultural Ambassadors for the 2017 season. She played every match in her debut season except for the round six match  against due to being omitted, and finished with six matches. She was delisted at the end of the 2017 season.

In 2018, she moved to Victoria to play with Carlton in the VFL Women's state competition.

Makur Chuot played with Richmond in the VFL Women's in 2019 and signed for the club ahead of the 2020 AFL Women's season. She made her club debut against  at Ikon Park in the opening round of the 2020 season. In June 2021, she was delisted by Richmond, with the intent to re-draft her. In the 2021 AFL Women's draft, Richmond indeed re-listed her with their final pick.

In Round 1, Makur Chuot played in their inaugural match against , she had 8 disposals.

Statistics
Updated to the end of S7 (2022).

|-
| 2017 ||  || 14
| 6 || 0 || 0 || 29 || 8 || 37 || 2 || 13 || 0.0 || 0.0 || 4.8 || 1.3 || 6.2 || 0.3 || 2.2 || 1
|-
| 2020 ||  || 34
| 6 || 0 || 0 || 44 || 13 || 57 || 8 || 12 || 0.0 || 0.0 || 7.3 || 2.2 || 9.5 || 1.3 || 2.0 || 0
|-
| 2021 ||  || 34
| 6 || 0 || 0 || 44 || 4 || 48 || 6 || 15 || 0.0 || 0.0 || 7.3 || 0.7 || 8.0 || 1.0 || 2.5 || 0
|-
| 2022 ||  || 34
| 5 || 1 || 2 || 22 || 2 || 24 || 6 || 4 || 0.2 || 0.4 || 4.4 || 0.4 || 4.8 || 1.2 || 0.8 || 0
|-
| S7 (2022) ||  || 34
| 10 || 1 || 0 || 83 || 12 || 95 || 25 || 21 || 0.1 || 0.0 || 8.3 || 1.2 || 9.5 || 2.5 || 2.1 || 2
|- class="sortbottom"
! colspan=3| Career
! 33 !! 2 !! 2 !! 222 !! 39 !! 261 !! 47 !! 65 !! 0.1 !! 0.1 !! 6.7 !! 1.2 !! 7.9 !! 1.4 !! 2.0 !! 3
|}

Honours and achievements 
Individual
  goal of the year: S7 (2022)
 Hawthorn games record holder: 10 (Tied with Charlotte Baskaran, Catherine Brown, Jess Duffin, Aileen Gilroy, Tilly Lucas-Rodd, Tamara Smith, and Lucy Wales)
  record holder for marks: 25 (Tied with Kaitlyn Ashmore, and Jess Duffin)
  record holder for marks in a season: 25 – S7 (2022) (Tied with Kaitlyn Ashmore, and Jess Duffin)

References

External links

1992 births
Living people
Fremantle Football Club (AFLW) players
Australian rules footballers from Western Australia
Australian people of South Sudanese descent
Sportspeople of South Sudanese descent
South Sudanese refugees
Sudanese refugees
Richmond Football Club (AFLW) players
Hawthorn Football Club (AFLW) players